Sclerocroton is a plant genus of the family Euphorbiaceae first described as a genus in 1845. There a total of 6 known species in this genus; 5 species in continental Africa and a single species in Madagascar.

Species
 Sclerocroton carterianus (J.Léonard) Kruijt & Roebers - Liberia, Ivory Coast, Sierra Leone
 Sclerocroton cornutus (Pax) Kruijt & Roebers - C + SC Africa from Cameroon to Zimbabwe plus Ivory Coast 
 Sclerocroton integerrimus Hochst. -  C + S Africa from Zaire to KawZulu-Natal, plus Guinea
 Sclerocroton melanostictus (Baill.) Kruijt & Roebers - Madagascar
 Sclerocroton oblongifolius (Müll.Arg.) Kruijt & Roebers - Zaire, Angola, Zambia, Zimbabwe
 Sclerocroton schmitzii (J.Léonard) Kruijt & Roebers - Zaire, Rwanda, Burundi, Zambia, Zimbabwe

Formerly included
moved to Shirakiopsis 
Sclerocroton ellipticus  - Shirakiopsis elliptica

References

Hippomaneae
Euphorbiaceae genera
Flora of Africa